Giovanni Angelo Canini (1609–1666) was an Italian painter and engraver of the Baroque period. 
[[File:Giovanni Angelo Canini - Study for a Fallen Angel - Google Art Project.jpg|thumb|Study for a Fallen Angel]]
He is also known as Giovanni Agnolo Canini or Giannangiolo. He was born at Rome, one of three brothers, sons of a stonemason named Vincenzo, all of whom became artists. The elder brother was a painter; while the younger brother, Marcantonio, a sculptor. He was first the pupil of Domenichino as a child, and traveled with him to Naples. There he worked with  Antonio Barbalonga. In 1634, at the request of Domenichino, he was commissioned to restore the oil paintings, which had been painted by Passignano on the walls of the chapel of St Sebastian in the Villa Aldobrandini in Frascati.

He painted two altarpieces: the Martyrdom of St Stephen and of Saints Bartholomew and Nicola with the Trinity (July 1644) for the church of San Martino ai Monti in Rome that belonged to the Oratorians of St Filippo Neri. In 1645 signing in the Castello Theodoli in Sambuci near Tivoli, he also painted frescoes for the brother of Cardinal Camillo Astalli, depicting the Stories of Rinaldo and Armida, mythological scenes and figures in chiaroscuro, with frescoed landscapes and fake architecture of colonnades.

He was known to various sources for Roman art, including Bellori and Passeri. He worked under Pietro da Cortona and with Cesi in the decoration of the gallery of Pope Alexander VII in the Palazzo Quirinale (1656–1657). He was received into the Accademia di San Luca of Rome in 1650, and was eventually was patronized by Queen Christina of Sweden. Though talented as an artist, he devoted much time to archaeology, and published two works on that subject. He also painted two canvases, a Conversion of St. Paul and a Resurrected Christ before Apostles, for the chapel of signor Vincenzo Baccelli in San Giovanni dei Fiorentini.

In 1657, Pier Francesco Mola asked Canini and Cozza to help in the decoration of the Palazzo Panfili in Valmontone. in 1659, he also painted two frescoes painted for the church of San Marco in Rome: Abdon and Sennen refuse to worship the Pagan Gods, and Mark approves the project for the construction of the church. Cardinal Astalli was instrumental for Canini in this commission.  In this same period he painted the Dispute of St Catherine for the Cesi chapel in Santa Maria Maggiore.

Having accompanied Cardinal Flavio Chigi to France, he was encouraged by the minister Colbert to execute designs from medals, antique gems and similar sources a series of portraits of the most illustrious characters of antiquity, accompanied with memoirs. In France he had engraved a portrait of Cardinal Mazzarino.

In Rome he continued to work for the Chigi in 1665, painting in his palace at Santi Apostoli. In 1666, he painted  a small gouache scenes with the Miracles of Francis de Sales for the church of Villa Versaglia at Formello. But in these years he began to devote himself almost exclusively to his interests scholars and antiquarians, shortly after, Canini died from a febrile illness. The work, however, was completed by his brother Marcantonio with the assistance of Jean Picard and Valet. It was published it in 1669, under the title of Iconografia di Giovanni Agnolo Canini''. It contains 50 engravings. A reprint in Italian and French appeared at Amsterdam in 1731.

References

 
 
 

1617 births
1666 deaths
Painters from Rome
17th-century Italian painters
Italian male painters
Italian archaeologists
Italian Baroque painters
Italian engravers
Fresco painters